Eupithecia extinctata is a moth in the family Geometridae. It is found in Tibet.

The wingspan is about 20 mm.

References

Moths described in 1904
extinctata
Moths of Asia